A. Taylor Ray House, also known as the Tuggle House, is a historic home located at Gallatin, Daviess County, Missouri.  It was built in 1896, and is a two-story, free classic Queen Anne style frame dwelling.  It sits on a cut limestone foundation and is topped by pyramid, gable, hip, shed and mansard roofs.  It features an octagonal tower and wraparound ornamented verandah.

It was listed on the National Register of Historic Places in 1980.

References

Houses on the National Register of Historic Places in Missouri
Queen Anne architecture in Missouri
Houses completed in 1897
Buildings and structures in Daviess County, Missouri
National Register of Historic Places in Daviess County, Missouri